Manimuthar River originates on the eastern slopes of Western Ghats in Tirunelveli District of the state of Tamil Nadu in southern India. It is a major tributary of the Thamirabarani River.

The tributaries of the Manimuthar are the Keezha River and the Varattar River. As a tributary, the Manimuther River adds a considerable amount of water to the Tamiraparani River as it seasonally is always in full.

In 1957, Manimuthar anicut was built across the river  before its juncture with the Tamiraparani.

Manjolai Hills

Located on top of the Manimuthar Dam and the Manimuthar Water Falls, the Manjolai area comprises tea plantations, small settlements around the tea plantations, Upper Kodaiyar Dam and a windy viewpoint called Kuthiravetti.

The tea plantations and the whole of Manjolai Estates are tea operated by The Bombay Burmah Trading Corporation Ltd on forest lands leased by Raja of Singampatti Samasthanam. There are three Tea Estates within the Manjolai area – Manjolai Estate, Manimutharu Estate and Oothu Estate.

The estates, road and settlements in the Manjolai area are managed by The Bombay Burmah Trading Corporation Ltd. Only the workers of Bombay Burmah Trading Corporation Ltd and employees of TNEB can enter the zone without any permission. Tourists must get prior permission from Amabasamudram Range Office (KMTR) before entering into the forest range. Only four wheelers are allowed. A special tourist vehicle is also arranged by KMTR to visit the tea plantations. Prior intimation and fees must be paid in order to enter into the forest zone.

Notes

Rivers of Tamil Nadu
Rivers of the Western Ghats
Tirunelveli district
Rivers of India